Rustam Khabibulovich Shelayev (born 30 March 1976) is a former Russian professional football player.

Club career
He made his Russian Football National League debut for FC Anzhi Makhachkala on 16 October 1997 in a game against PFC Spartak Nalchik. That was his only season in the FNL.

External links
 

1976 births
Living people
Russian footballers
Association football goalkeepers
FC Anzhi Makhachkala players
Azerbaijan Premier League players
Russian expatriate footballers
Expatriate footballers in Azerbaijan
FC Dynamo Makhachkala players
Russian expatriate sportspeople in Azerbaijan